A mat is a hard floor covering that generally is placed on a floor or other flat surface. Mats serve a range of purposes including:
 serving to clean items passed over it, such as a doormat, which removes dirt from the soles of shoes
 protecting that which is above the mat, such as a wrestling or gymnastics mat, or an anti-vibration mat
 protecting that which is beneath the mat, such as a place mat or the matting used in archival framing and preservation of documents and paintings
 providing a regular or flat surface, such as a cushioned computer mousepad

Types

In domestic settings 
 In homes or rooms where people sit predominantly on the floor (common in Japan, Korea, India, and formerly China), mats may cover entire rooms, or be used in certain areas for sitting or sleeping. The traditional Japanese style of mat is known as the tatami. Shoes are typically removed before entering these areas to keep out dirt and debris.
 A doormat or door-mat is a flat, usually rectangular but sometimes oval, object, usually placed immediately outside or inside the entrance to a house or other building, to allow people to easily scrub or wipe the soles of their shoes before entering. Doormats are usually made from tough, long-lasting material such as coir, palmyra (palm) fibres and stalks, nylon, rubber, cloth, or aluminium and other metals. A doormat may also be known as a welcome mat, as its location at an entrance constitutes a "welcome" to visitors, and may therefore also bear some word, message or sign of greeting. The lowly purpose for which doormats exist has also led to informal use of the term as a reference to people who behave timidly or passively when exploited by others (see also Caspar Milquetoast).
 A cabinet mat is a mat made of rubber that protects kitchen cabinets, more particularly kitchen sink base cabinets, from leaks, water damage, mold and household item spills that commonly occur in the kitchen sink cabinet.
 A bath mat is used on the floor of a bathroom to provide a warm non-slip surface, and to absorb small amounts of water, much like a towel. 
 A place mat or serving mat is a flat piece of fabric or other type of  material used on a table at the points at which dishes and plates will be located during a meal. One of the common purposes of such mats is to provide a thermal and physical barrier between that which is placed on the table, and the table itself—for instance, to stop hot objects from marring the finish.

Car mats 

A car mat is designed to help protect a vehicle's carpeted floors. One major use of a car mat is to keep mud, sand and snow from contacting the carpeted floors. Some require fixation points to ensure they remain fixed in position.

Carpet mats and rubber mats differ in a number of ways. Carpet mats are generally tufted and have a rubberised anti-slip backing. On the other hand, rubber car mats are heavy duty and higher durability. While some car mats are the plain colour of rubber, many contain branded company logos, cartoon characters or advertisements. Some are in textile form of carpet material. They can also come in a wide range of colours. The terms universal and custom fit mats differentiate between floor mats that will fit a multitude of different cars and those that are specifically designed to fit only one chassis.

Anti-fatigue mats 
"Anti-fatigue mats" are designed to help a person who is working in a standing position for prolonged periods of time. Most anti-fatigue matting is a combination of an ergonomic pattern and a cushioning underlay. The cushioning causes constant subconscious balance checks and micro movements that stimulate blood flow through the legs and lower extremities. This results in better circulation and less fatigue. The cushioning underlay insulates the feet from the hard surface, cold floors, vibrations, moisture and sound. Their unique design encourages the user to make continual micro-movements which provides a wealth of health benefits, such as minimizing back pain, foot pain, weariness, stress, etc. Anti-fatigue mats are one of the approaches to prevent injuries, caused by working in a standing position. In a study at the Center of Ergonomics at the University of Michigan in 1987, ergonomist Mark Redfern concluded that different standing surfaces can have dramatic effects on physical fatigue. Workers who stood on anti-fatigue mats were able to reduce the level of fatigue and discomfort by as much as 50%. This type of mat is recommended by Occupational Safety and Health Administration. The range of common materials for manufacturing anti-fatigue mats includes vinyl, wood, PVC tubing, rubber, PVC closed cell foam, polypropylene, nitrile rubber. Anti-fatigue mats were initially used in factories and production lines where staff has to stand for the majority of their working shifts.

Anti-fatigue mats come in various types and materials for industrial or commercial applications for a variety of workplace conditions that exist as well as the variety of workplace designs from individual work benches, to large assembly lines or complex manufacturing work stations. Work place environments can vary from dry areas to wet or extremely oily areas. Plus specialized industries may need additional properties such as fire retardant matting for welding, static dissipative matting for electrostatic discharge (ESD) protection, anti-microbial for food industry applications.

Today, this type of ergonomic mat is commonly used during trade shows for floor covering, in hospitals and clinics during surgeries to cover the floor near surgical tables to minimize surgeons fatigue resulted from continuous standing. Also these mats are used in housekeeping, especially for kitchen floors to alleviate fatigue during cooking.

Cleanroom mats 

The purpose of a clean room mat is to keep sterile the areas that require ultimate protection from dirt, bacteria and any contamination brought from outside. Clean room mats are tacky, sticky, non slip mats that possess multiple layers of clean film that effectively capture dirt and dust from foot traffic and wheels. Peel-off mats are made up of multiple sheets of polyethylene film coated with acrylic adhesive that traps particles. Each layer peels off to reveal a new clean surface. The adhesive backing prevents microbial growth and contamination. Mats used outside clean rooms and laboratories are designed to withhold foreign pollution elements. This goal is achieved by a sticky surface that serves as a barrier for debris, dirt and dust adhered to shoe soles. Clean room sticky mats can contain two defensive barriers: the first part is a carpet itself, while the second part is sticky surface mat. Another mat type to be used to protect rooms from pollution is sanitizing foot bath floor mats. The mat itself is a small bath that contains sanitizing liquid. The foot bath bottom is covered with pliable rubber scrapers for effective cleaning of footwear soles while the liquid disinfects them.

An alternative clean room mat is one made from polymeric material. Polymeric products are made from a blend of pure polymeric compounds and have a three- to five-year life cycle. When a polymeric surface becomes dirty, operators can clean it with a sponge and a mop with detergent and dry the surface with a sqee. This quick cleaning process can be incorporated into the facility's regular wet-clean cycle.

The mats differ by composition:

 One-piece mats are usually used on the permanent basis. One-piece mats can be handcrafted or factory-made. The standard shapes of one-piece mat are rectangular, square, round and elliptic. One-piece mats are produced in the huge variety of sizes and colors. Real and synthetic materials are used for one-piece mats production.
 Linear length mats are manufactured as rolls that can extend 20 meters up to 40 meters for long production lines, assembly lines and packing lines. Mats are manufactured in standard lengths or factory-made to custom sizes.
 Modular mats, also well known as interlocking tiles or interlocking floor mats, are manufactured using the “jigsaw puzzle” structure. Unlike one-piece mats, modular mats consist of numerous elements that are easily and seamlessly assembled. Compared to other types of mats, interlocking mats come in several sizes, depending on the number of pieces in one kit. Modular mats are a good solution for non-rectangular areas where standard shape mats are useless. Interlocking mats are commonly used on a one-time or temporary basis: fitness centres and sport competitions, trade shows and conferences. Modular mats require less place for storage and can be easily transported.

Rubber grass mats 
Rubber grass mats are used commonly for around play equipment on playgrounds, schools and domestic properties where there is a risk of falling. As one of the most common and simple methods of protecting against a critical fall from height, rubber grass mats are usually simply laid on a grass or soil surface and immediately offer protection against serious harm. Usually made from a virgin rubber material and a featuring a design which is around 90% open cell, the mats allow for grass to grow within the structure, offering a green and free draining solution to improving safety in play areas and playgrounds.

Also used commonly for temporary events, such as festivals or weddings, rubber grass mats can be used to create a removable path or standing area and help to protect the grass from erosion or churn. As the mats are usually simply pegged into the ground and cable-tied to each other, they are usually installed very quickly and can also be removed at speed with minimal to no impact on the turfed surface.

Others 

 an anti-vibration mat, which performs the function of isolating vibration between that which is above the mat and that which is below. Such a mat might typically be used when mounting a heavy machine which vibrates, onto a concrete floor; in the absence of the anti-vibration mat, the machine tend to erode the floor through abrasion. Contrawise, some machines, such as the lithography machines used in chip fabs, need to be isolated from vibrations in their locale, and so are mounted on anti-vibration mats.
 a slipmat, a circular piece of slippery cloth or synthetic material designed to allow disc jockeys to turn or stop vinyl records on record players, or to scratch.
 a bar mat (not beermat), a rectangular piece of rubber or towelling material that is used to protect the counter top and/or soak up spilt drinks in a bar or pub.
 an entrance mat, which performs the function of trapping and retaining dust and soil at the entrances. It will also trap moisture to prevent slip and fall accidents. The purpose is having better indoor environment and better air quality. It should be easier to clean the entrance mat than all the interiors.

History

Matting or  floor covering  or  rugs is any of many coarse woven or plaited fibrous materials used for covering floors or furniture, for hanging as screens, for wrapping up heavy merchandise and for other miscellaneous purposes. In the United Kingdom, under the name of "coir" matting, a large amount of a coarse kind of carpet is made from coconut fibre; and the same material, as well as strips of cane, manila hemp, various grasses and rushes, is largely employed in various forms for making doormats. Large quantities of the coconut fibre are woven in heavy looms, then cut up into various sizes, and finally bound round the edges by a kind of rope made from the same material. The mats may be of one colour only, or they may be made of different colours and in different designs. Sometimes the names of institutions are introduced into the mats.
Due to the silky nature and tensile strength, jute mats or mattings have started being used as floor covering or doormats, runners and in different forms.  Jute floor coverings consist of woven and tufted and piled carpets. Jute Mats and mattings starting from 1 m width to 6 m width and of continuous length are easily being woven in Southern parts of India, in solid and fancy shades, and in different weaves such as boucle, Panama and herringbone. Jute mats and rugs are made on both powerlooms and handlooms  in large volumes in Kerala, India. Indian jute mattings / rugs are being widely used in USA and European countries, due to its soft nature.  Jute can be easily bleached, colored or printed, similar to textile fibres, with eco-friendly dyes and chemicals.  Hand-knotted jute carpets and mattings are also being made from Kerala, India.

Another type of mat is made exclusively from the above-mentioned coir rope by arranging alternate layers in sinuous and straight paths, and then stitching the parts together. It is also largely used for the outer covering of ships' fenders. Perforated and otherwise prepared rubber, as well as wire-woven material, are also largely utilized for door and floor mats. Matting of various kinds is very extensively employed throughout India for floor coverings, the bottoms of bedsteads, fans and fly-flaps, etc.; and a considerable export trade in such manufactures is carried on. The materials used are numerous; but the principal substances are straw, the bulrushes Typha elephantina and Typha angustifolia, leaves of the date palm (Phoenix sylvestris), of the dwarf palm (Chamaerops Ritchiana), of the Palmyra palm (Borassus flabelliformis), of the coconut palm (Cocos nucifera) and of the screw pine (Pandanus odoratissimus), the munja or munj grass (Saccharum Munja) and allied grasses, and the mat grasses Cyperus textilis and Cyperus pangorei.

The mats made from Cyperus pangorei (Korai in Tamil) are called "Korai paai" in Tamil and can be found widely in the households of Tamil Nadu, usually in the size 6 feet by 3 feet. They are usually dyed in colors of bright red, green or purple, resulting in patterns. These mats differ in their levels of flexibility, fineness and price. Pattamadai paai (named after the region Pattamadai, near Tirunelveli) is generally considered the finest "paai". Many of these Indian grass-mats are  examples of elegant design, and the colors in which they are woven are rich, harmonious and effective. Mats made from Vandavasi are also famed and used commonly. These days, along with these natural grass mats, one can also find plastic mats, which are easier to maintain and are cheaper.  This class of work obtains in India, Japan and other Eastern countries. Vast quantities of coarse matting used for packing furniture, heavy and coarse goods, flax and other plants, etc., are made in Russia from the bast or inner bark of the lime tree. This industry centres in the great forest governments of Viatka, Nizhniy-Novgorod, Kostroma, Kazan, Perm and Simbirsk.

Promoting safety and health
Quality floor mats improve indoor air quality (IAQ) and safety in commercial and residential applications. Studies have shown that most toxic chemicals that end up inside a home are tracked in on people's shoes. A well-used door mat can trap and hold dirt and allergens, preventing their spread into the rest of the building, significantly improving IAQ and reducing the need for extensive cleaning. Additionally many floor mats are resistant to welding sparks and can keep employees from slipping on industrial lubricants or water.

Floor mats also provide safe surfaces on which to walk, preventing slips and falls that cause injury and liability damages. Anti-slip mats are now required in many areas to ensure maximum protection for both employees and customers. Specialized anti-slip mats are now available that provide extra resistance to the chemicals and grease that are sometimes found in industrial and food service settings.

Custom made anti-fatigue mats are also used in work areas where employees are required to stand for long periods of time. Employers have found that much muscle strain and injury endured by workers is caused by improper flooring conditions. Non-supportive surfaces cause fatigue and foot, back and neck pain due to impaired circulation. Anti-fatigue mats were shown to improve worker productivity by reducing the number of sick-days and injuries sustained by workers whose mobility would otherwise be restricted.

See also

 Algal mat, a type of microbial mat formed on the water surface or on the surface of rocks
 Egbere, a mat-carrying creature in Yoruba mythology
 Marston Mat, used primarily for the rapid construction of temporary runways and landing strips
 Mat (picture framing)
 Prayer rug
 Roll mat or sleeping pad
 Tatami
 Woven mat (disambiguation)
 Yoga mat

References

External links 
 

Floors
Tableware
Domestic implements